Susana Sumelzo Jordán (born 1969) is a Spanish politician of the Spanish Socialist Workers' Party (PSOE) who has been serving as member of the Congress of Deputies since 2011.

Early life and career
Born on 22 December 1969 in Zaragoza, Sumelzo graduated in Law at the University of Zaragoza. She later worked for a time at a law firm, as well as a 8-year spell at the Provincial Deputation of Zaragoza.

Political career

Early beginnings
Sumelzo joined the Spanish Socialist Workers' Party (PSOE) in 1990, when she was 20 years old. She ran as PSOE senatorial candidate for the province of Zaragoza vis-à-vis the 2008 general election; Sumelzo was elected and she served as member of the Upper House for its 8th term integrated within the Socialist Parliamentary Group.

Member of Parliament, 2011–present
Regarding the 2011 general election, she ran in the PSOE list for Zaragoza for the Congress of Deputies. She was elected, and she has renovated her seat at the 2015, 2016, and 2019 general elections. She was one of the 15 MPs of the Socialist Parliamentary Group who, in October 2016, broke party discipline and refused to abstain in the investiture vote of Mariano Rajoy, voting against instead. Once Pedro Sánchez made a comeback to party leadership, Sumelzo joined the PSOE's Federal Executive Board in June 2017, charged with responsibilities at the Area of Municipal Politics.

Following the 28 April 2019 general election, Sumelzo was elected to chair the Joint Congress-Senate Committee for the European Union on 30 July 2019.

In addition to her committee assignments, Sumelzo has been a member of the Spanish delegation to the Parliamentary Assembly of the Council of Europe (PACE) since 2019. In the Assembly, she has served on the Committee on Political Affairs and Democracy (since 2022); the Sub-Committee on Democracy (since 2022); the Sub-Committee on the Europe Prize (since 2020); the Sub-Committee on the European Social Charter (since 2020); the Sub-Committee on Children (2020–2022); the Committee on Social Affairs, Health and Sustainable Development (2019–2022); and the Sub-Committee on Gender Equality (2020–2021).

References 

1969 births
Living people
Members of the 10th Congress of Deputies (Spain)
Members of the 11th Congress of Deputies (Spain)
Members of the 12th Congress of Deputies (Spain)
Members of the 13th Congress of Deputies (Spain)
Members of the 9th Senate of Spain
Women members of the Congress of Deputies (Spain)
Members of the 14th Congress of Deputies (Spain)